The Yellow Teddy Bears (US: Gutter Girls and The Thrill Seekers) is a 1963 British drama film directed by Robert Hartford-Davis and starring Jacqueline Ellis, Iain Gregory, Raymond Huntley and Georgina Patterson.

Premise
The pupils at a girls' school deal with adult issues such as teen pregnancy.

Cast
 Jacqueline Ellis - Anne Mason
 Iain Gregory - Kinky 
 Georgina Patterson - Pat 
 John Bonney - Paul 
 Annette Whiteley - Linda 
 Douglas Sheldon - Mike Griffin 
 Victor Brooks - George Donaghue 
 Anne Kettle - Sally 
 Lesley Dudley as Joan
 Jill Adams - June Wilson 
 John Glyn-Jones - Benny Wintle 
 Raymond Huntley - Harry Halburton 
 Harriette Johns - Lady Gregg 
 Noel Dyson - Muriel Donaghue
 Richard Bebb - Frank Lang 
 Ann Castle - Eileen Lang
 Micheline Patton - Mrs. Broome
Irene Richardson - extra

References

External links

1963 films
1963 drama films
British drama films
Films directed by Robert Hartford-Davis
1960s English-language films
1960s British films